STANAG 1472 NVD (Night Vision Device) Compatible Flight Deck Status Displays on Single Ships is a NATO Standardization Agreement which provides guidance in the design of NVD compatible Flight Deck status displays to promote maximum commonality between operating nations.

Sources
 NATO STANAG 1472 INT (Ed. 1, 2011) NVD Compatible Flight Deck Status Displays on Single Ships

1472